The Remedy is an 2012 album by singer Karima Francis.

Track listing

References

2012 albums